The 1893 Wimbledon Championships took place on the outdoor grass courts at the All England Lawn Tennis Club in Wimbledon, London, United Kingdom. The tournament ran from 10 July until 20 July. It was the 17th staging of the Wimbledon Championships, and the first Grand Slam tennis event of 1893.

Champions

Men's singles

 Joshua Pim defeated  Wilfred Baddeley, 3–6, 6–1, 6–3, 6–2

Women's singles

 Lottie Dod defeated  Blanche Hillyard, 6–8, 6–1, 6–4

Men's doubles

 Joshua Pim /  Frank Stoker defeated  Harry Barlow /  Ernest Lewis, 4–6, 6–3, 6–1, 2–6, 6–0

References

External links
 Official Wimbledon Championships website

 
Wimbledon Championships
Wimbledon Championships
Wimbledon Championships
July 1893 sports events